Frederick Claudius Williams (September 10, 1855 – March 6, 1940) was an American orchardist, beekeeper, and funeral director. He was the thirteenth President of the Chico Board of Trustees, the governing body of Chico, California from 1895 to 1897.

He operated Fetters and Williams, a business in Chico. They were undertakers, dealers in furniture, carpets, window shades, wallpaper, and glass. The business was located at the southeast corner of Main Street and East 2nd Streets.

He was born in Earlville, Illinois in September 1855, the son of William Williams and Rachel Davis.

He came to California in 1876, and worked on a farm in Marysville. He came to Chico in 1878. He partnered with Charles Fetters and opened Fetters and Williams. In 1906, Williams bought out Mr. Fetters and continued the business under the same name.

Williams was also interested in horticulture, and owned several orchards of almonds and prunes on his ranch near Lone Pine Avenue. He was the first person in Butte County to operate apiaries. His operation grew to six apiaries containing nearly eight hundred colonies of bees, becoming the largest exporter of honey in the area.

Associations 
 Member, Independent Order of Odd Fellows
 Member, Benevolent and Protective Order of Elks
 Member, State Funeral Directors’ Association
 Director, Butte County Fair Association

References 

1855 births
1940 deaths
American beekeepers
American orchardists
California city council members
California Republicans
American funeral directors
Mayors of Chico, California
People from Earlville, Illinois